Elections for Oxford City Council were held on Thursday 6 May 2010. As Oxford City Council is elected by halves, one seat in each of the 24 wards was up for election.

Labour gained 2 seats (Barton and Sandhills ward from the Liberal Democrats and Northfield Brook ward from the Independent Working Class Association), the Liberal Democrats also gained two seats (Carfax and St Clement's ward, both from the Green Party). As a result of this election, Labour gained control of the city council, with 25 out of 48 seats.

A general election was held on the same day, which accounts for the higher turnout (61.7%).

Election results

Note: one Independent is standing in 2010, compared with three in 2008 and two in 2006. No candidates representing the Independent Working Class Association are standing in this election. No UKIP candidates were standing in 2008.

This result has the following consequences for the total number of seats on the Council after the elections:

Results by ward

Note: Gains and holds of wards are noted with respect to the 2006 council election (or a by-election of the same seat). Percentage changes are given with respect to the 2008 council election (or the latest by-election).

Turnout figures are the sum of the votes for each candidate only and do not yet include rejected ballots. These numbers will be included in the sum when available.

Barton and Sandhills

Blackbird Leys

Carfax

Churchill

Cowley

Note that Shah Khan won the Cowley seat in the 2006 elections for the Liberal Democrats, but crossed the floor to Labour in 2007. So when comparing to the 2006 elections, Labour gain from Liberal Democrats.

Cowley Marsh

Headington

Headington Hill and Northway

Note: ±% figures are calculated with respect to the results of the by-election of 26 March 2009.

Hinksey Park

Holywell

Note: ±% figures are calculated with respect to the results of the by-election of 12 June 2008.

Iffley Fields

Jericho and Osney

Littlemore

Lye Valley

Marston

North

Northfield Brook

Quarry and Risinghurst

Rose Hill and Iffley

St. Clement's

St. Margaret's

St. Mary's

Summertown

Wolvercote

Party Share of Vote Map

References

2010
2010 English local elections
May 2010 events in the United Kingdom
2010s in Oxford